The Vishista Seva Vibhushanaya (VSV, Distinguished Service Decoration) (Sinhala: විශිෂ්ට සේවා විභූෂණය viṣiṣta sēvā vibhūṣaṇaya) is awarded to senior officers of the Military of Sri Lanka in recognition of:

Award process
Service commanders are responsible for evaluation of suitable candidates for conferment of the award, and make formal recommendations based on several requirements:
a rank above Lieutenant Colonel (Army), Commander (Navy) or Wing Commander (Air Force)
an uninterrupted service period of 25 years or more at the time of consideration
a personal record clear of entries
Upon successful review, the decoration is usually awarded during the National Day parade (or at a special investiture ceremony) by the President. Recipients are entitled to the use of the post-nominal letters "VSV".

References

External links
Sri Lanka Army
Sri Lanka Navy
Sri Lanka Air Force
Ministry of Defence : Sri Lanka

Military awards and decorations of Sri Lanka
Awards established in 1981